Cor(e)y or Corrie Brown(e) may also refer to:

Corey Brown (American football) (born 1991), American football wide receiver
Corey Brown (baseball) (born 1985), American baseball player
Corey Brown (jockey) (born 1976), Australian jockey
Corey Brown (politician) (born 1974), American state senator in South Dakota
Corey Brown (soccer) (born 1994), Australian footballer (soccer)
Cory Brown (born 1996), New Zealand footballer
Corrie Brown (1949–2007), British bobsledder